Bedminster may refer to:

Places
 Bedminster, Bristol, England
 Bedminster railway station, Bristol
 Bedminster, New Jersey, United States
 Trump National Golf Club Bedminster, located in the town
 Bedminster Township, Bucks County, Pennsylvania, United States
 Bedminster, Pennsylvania, United States
 Bedminster Center, Bucks County, Pennsylvania, United States

See also
 Bedminster Down, an area in Bishopsworth, Bristol
 Beaminster, Dorset, England